MLW Underground Wrestling is a professional wrestling television program produced by Major League Wrestling (MLW) that originally premiered on February 7, 2023, on Reelz. The show takes its name after the promotion's original television series, MLW Underground TV, which was produced from 2003 to 2004.

History
On January 20, 2023, MLW announced a broadcast deal with the American cable channel Reelz to produce a new flagship show titled MLW Underground Wrestling. As part of the agreement, Reelz would also air past MLW content in a two-hour block including the series. A re-edited version of Battle Riot IV, which took place on June 23, 2022, and later aired on November 3, 2022, on Pro Wrestling TV, aired immediately after the series premiere.

The premiere episode featured segments from the 2022 Fightland event, which was originally taped for the promotion's other weekly series, MLW Fusion, with the Last Man Standing match between Alexander Hammerstone and EJ Nduka for the MLW World Heavyweight Championship serving as the main event.

On February 28, it was reported by Variety that MLW's deal with Reelz would conclude after 10 weeks. In a statement made to PWInsider, the network confirmed that "No decisions have been made by MLW or REELZ and we are both committed to a good outcome for MLW, its fans and REELZ."

Roster

The wrestlers featured on Major League Wrestling take part in scripted feuds and storylines. Wrestlers are portrayed as either villains or heroes in the scripted events that build tension and culminate in a wrestling match.

Commentators

References

2023 American television series debuts
American professional wrestling television series
Underground Wrestling
Reelz original programming